Hagbart Steffens (13 August 1874 – 27 June 1932) was a Norwegian sportsperson. As a yacht racer he competed in the 1908 Summer Olympics.

Steffens was born in Kristiania. In 1908 he was part of the Norwegian Fram crew, which finished fourth in the Olympic 8 metre class competition. He represented the Royal Norwegian Yacht Club. He was also an early member of the skiing club SK Ondur. He died in June 1932.

Further reading

References

Norwegian male sailors (sport)
Sailors at the 1908 Summer Olympics – 8 Metre
Olympic sailors of Norway
Sportspeople from Oslo
1874 births
1932 deaths